OR1 or OR-1 may refer to:

OR-1: a collection of hominid teeth and cranium fragments discovered at the Obi-Rakhmat Grotto in Uzbekistan
NATO rank OR-1
Oregon's 1st congressional district
Oregon Route 1, a part of the Pacific Highway (U.S.)